Torrado is a Spanish surname. Notable people with the surname include:

Carlos Manuel Pazo Torrado (born 1963), Cuban politician
Gerardo Torrado (born 1979), Mexican footballer
José Asensio Torrado (1892–1961), Spanish general
Osvaldo Dorticós Torrado (1919–1983), Cuban politician
Ramón Torrado (1905-1990), Spanish film director and screenwriter

Spanish-language surnames